Conservation form or Eulerian form refers to an arrangement of an equation or system of equations, usually representing a hyperbolic system, that emphasizes that a property represented is conserved, i.e. a type of continuity equation. The term is usually used in the context of continuum mechanics.

General form 
Equations in conservation form take the form

for any conserved quantity , with a suitable function . An equation of this form can be transformed into an integral equation

using the divergence theorem.

The integral form of such equations is usually the physically more natural formulation, and the differential equation arises from differentiation. Since the integral equation can also have non-differentiable solutions, the equality of both formulations can break down in some cases, leading to weak solutions and severe numerical difficulties in simulations of such equations.

Example 
An example of a set of equations written in conservation form are the Euler equations of fluid flow:

Each of these represents the conservation of mass, momentum and energy, respectively.

See also
 Conservation law
 Lagrangian and Eulerian specification of the flow field

Further reading 
 
 Randall J. LeVeque: Finite Volume Methods for Hyperbolic Problems. Cambridge University Press, Cambridge 2002,  (Cambridge Texts in Applied Mathematics).

Algebra
Conservation equations